Ivanofeio Sports Arena is an indoor sports arena that is located in Thessaloniki, Greece. Its capacity is 2,500 spectators, and it is mainly used as the home court of the Greek professional basketball club Iraklis.

Location
Ivanofeio Sports Arena is located in the city centre of Thessaloniki, next to the campus of the Aristotle University of Thessaloniki. It can be accessed by bus lines 15, 17, and 37.

History
Ivanofeio Sports Arena opened in 1987, to host the games of Iraklis. It is owned by GS Iraklis, and was named after Jerzy Iwanow-Szajnowicz, a Polish athlete of GS Iraklis, and a member of the Greek Resistance, who was executed ιν 1943 in Athens by the Axis occupation forces. Expansion works took place in 1991, to increase the capacity from 1,300 to 2,500. Ivanofeio has hosted games of the Greek Basket League, the EuroLeague, the Korać Cup, and the Saporta Cup. Iraklis' fans refer to Ivanofeio as "o Naos", which is Greek for "the Temple".

Apart from Iraklis, Ivanofeio hosted the home games of Aris during the 2003–04 season. Ivanofeio also hosts non-sports activities, such as music concerts.

Gallery

See also

 Iraklis Thessaloniki
 G.S. Iraklis Thessaloniki
 List of indoor arenas in Greece

References

External links

Arena Info at stadia.gr

Basketball venues in Greece
Indoor arenas in Greece
Iraklis Thessaloniki B.C.
Sports venues in Thessaloniki
Sports venues completed in 1987